Selmentauzen (Selman-Tevzana or Дуццахоте, Duccaxote)  is a rural locality (a selo) in Vedensky District, Chechnya.

Administrative and municipal status 
Municipally, Selmentauzen is incorporated into Selmentauzenskoye rural settlement. It is the administrative center of the municipality and is one of the three settlements included in it.

Geography 

Selmentauzen is located between the Vashtar and Tenik.

The nearest settlements to Selmentauzen are Dutsin-Khutor in the south-west, Zonakh in the west, Ulus-Kert in the north-west, and Makhkety and Tevzana in the north-east.

History 
In 1944, after the genocide and deportation of the Chechen and Ingush people and the Chechen-Ingush ASSR was abolished, the village of Selmentauzen was renamed to Khvarshini, and settled by people from the neighboring republic of Dagestan. From 1944 to 1957, it was a part of the Vedensky District of the Dagestan ASSR.

In 1958, after the Vaynakh people returned and the Chechen-Ingush ASSR was restored, the village regained its old name, Selmentauzen.

As of 1 January 1990, the rural settlement included the settlements of Nizhny Selmentauzen (284 people) and Verkhny Selementauzen (309 people).

Population 
 1990 Census: 593
 2002 Census: 834
 2010 Census: 909
 2019 estimate: ?

According to the results of the 2010 Census, the majority of residents of Selmentauzen were ethnic Chechens.

References 

Rural localities in Vedensky District